Rhytiphora deserti is a species of beetle in the family Cerambycidae. It was described by Thomas Blackburn in 1896, originally under the genus Symphyletes.

References

deserti
Beetles described in 1896
Taxa named by Thomas Blackburn (entomologist)